Craig Anthony Bullock, also known by his stage name DJ Homicide (born December 17, 1970), is an American musician, DJ, rapper, singer, record producer and radio personality. He was the DJ of the rock band Sugar Ray.

DJ Homicide hosts The Blast on SKEE 24/7 on Dash Radio.

Life and career
He was born and raised in Pasadena, California. Along his shoulders is a tattoo that reads "City Of Roses" (a reference to the town's nickname).

On top of his work with Sugar Ray, Bullock spends a great deal of time as a solo artist, appearing as a featured DJ at nightclubs all across the country. At these performances he primarily plays mash-ups (both his own and others) as well as songs in their original format. The genre of his musical library is diverse, but primarily contemporary (1980s—present day). He has created three full-length promotional CD mixes; Live From Los Scandalous, Homicide's House and LASONIC. All were released under SKAM Artist records, as well as available for download through his websites.

Bullock was inspired to start DJing after listening to radio station KDAY and was briefly a member of The Alkaholiks. He joined Sugar Ray after the completion of their debut Lemonade and Brownies. His friend DJ Lethal worked on the CD but did not want to perform live with the band so he suggested his friend (Homicide). Bullock went on to join Sugar Ray officially.

Bullock's functions in the band are producing, writing and background vocals. Most notably he can be heard in the hook of "Every Morning" saying "Shut the door baby, don't say a word." When Sugar Ray performs "Fly" and "Mr. Bartender (It's So Easy)" Bullock often raps in lieu of Super Cat and Prohoezak. Bullock improvises sound manipulations and digitally replaces the drum track when Stan Frazier chooses to play acoustic guitar.

Bullock's father died in 2004. He has a sister (and a nephew). He has homes in Miami, FL and Los Angeles, CA.
 
With the band, Bullock has appeared in the films Scooby-Doo and Father's Day and the TV show Las Vegas.

On August 22, 2010, it was announced on Sugar Ray's Twitter page that Bullock had left the band.

References

External links
 
 Official Sugar Ray
 Craig Anthony at SKAM Artist

1970 births
African-American DJs
Living people
Musicians from Pasadena, California
Sugar Ray members
21st-century African-American people
20th-century African-American people